Day is a town in southwest Marathon County, Wisconsin, United States. It is part of the Wausau, Wisconsin Metropolitan Statistical Area. The population was 1,085 at the 2010 census. The unincorporated community of Rozellville is located in the town. The unincorporated community of Rangeline is also located partially in the town.

Geography
According to the United States Census Bureau, the town has a total area of 34.0 square miles (88.0 km), of which 33.7 square miles (87.4 km) is land and 0.2 square miles (0.6 km), or 0.71%, is water.

Demographics
At the 2000 census there were 1,023 people, 357 households, and 294 families living in the town. The population density was 30.3 people per square mile (11.7/km).  There were 367 housing units at an average density of 10.9 per square mile (4.2/km).  The racial makeup of the town was 98.92% White, 0.10% Asian, and 0.98% from two or more races. Hispanic or Latino of any race were 0.10%.

Of the 357 households 37.0% had children under the age of 18 living with them, 71.1% were married couples living together, 5.6% had a female householder with no husband present, and 17.6% were non-families. 15.1% of households were one person and 8.4% were one person aged 65 or older. The average household size was 2.87 and the average family size was 3.18.

The age distribution was 25.8% under the age of 18, 9.2% from 18 to 24, 29.5% from 25 to 44, 24.6% from 45 to 64, and 10.9% 65 or older. The median age was 36 years. For every 100 females, there were 109.2 males. For every 100 females age 18 and over, there were 110.2 males.

The median household income was $47,500 and the median family income  was $50,288. Males had a median income of $30,455 versus $21,417 for females. The per capita income for the town was $17,725. About 3.7% of families and 4.1% of the population were below the poverty line, including 1.9% of those under age 18 and 13.0% of those age 65 or over.

Notable person

 Frank Nikolay, Wisconsin State Representative, was born in the town

References

Towns in Marathon County, Wisconsin
Towns in Wisconsin